O Espírito da Paz (English: "The Spirit of Peace") is the third studio album by Portuguese group Madredeus. It was released on 23 June 1994 by EMI-Valentim de Carvalho.

Recording 
O Espírito da Paz was recorded and mixed between 27 March and 5 May 1994 at the Great Linford Manor and Lansdowne Recording Studios, in England. Recording and mixing were done by António Pinheiro da Silva and Jonathan Miller. The mastering was done at the CTS Studios in London, on 4 May 1994.

Track listing

Personnel 
Credits are adapted from the album's inner notes.

Madredeus

 Teresa Salgueiro – voice
 José Peixoto – guitar
 Pedro Ayres Magalhães – guitar
 Francisco Ribeiro – cello
 Gabriel Gomes – accordion
 Rodrigo Leão – keyboards

Production

 Pedro Ayres Magalhães – production
 António Pinheiro da Silva – recording, mixing
 Jonathan Miller – recording, mixing
 Andy Griffin – assistant at Linford Manor
 Mark Tucker – assistant at Lansdowne
 Mike Brown – digital editing
 Inês Gonçalves – photography
 Alberto Lopes – graphics and layout
 António Cunha – executive producer

Charts

References 

Madredeus albums
EMI Records albums
1994 albums